Abubakar Sani Bello (born 17 December 1967) also known as Lolo, is a Nigerian politician and the current executive Governor of Niger State, Nigeria. He is a member of All Progressive Congress (APC)

Background
Abubakar Sani Bello was Born on 17 December 1967. He is the son of the Nigerian former military Governor of old Kano state  Col. Sani Bello (RTD). He attended ST. Loius primary school, Kano from 1974 - 1979 and later went to Nigerian Military School from 1980 - 1985 then was given admission into University of Maiduguri 1986 - 1991 where he obtained a B.Sc in Economics. He has worked in various places in the country, starting from his NYSC days, where he was posted to serve in Port Harcourt in the Marketing department of NICOTES Services as Supervisor.

Political career

Gubernatorial run
Alhaji Abubakar Sani Bello won the Niger State, APC gubernatorial primaries for the 2015 election. He polled 3,829 votes to defeat Senator Musa Ibrahim in the primary election. He later went ahead to win the general election with a total of 593,709 votes. He was declared winner by the INEC on 13 April 2015.
On March 9, 2019, he was reelected as the Governor of Niger State.

On 24 August 2020, he endorsed a Reconciliation Committee and other committees at a State Executive Committee meeting, together with members of the National Assembly from the State led by Senator Aliyu Sabi Abdullahi and other Party Chieftains. This Committee's aim is to rebuild and reposition the party for better performance in 2023 elections.

See also
List of Governors of Niger State

References

1967 births
Living people
Nigerian Muslims
Action Congress of Nigeria politicians
Nigerian bankers
University of Maiduguri alumni
Governors of Niger State
20th-century Nigerian businesspeople
21st-century Nigerian businesspeople
All Progressives Congress politicians